A cap ‘n’ bells is a type of fool’s cap with bells worn by a court fool or jester. The bells were also added to the dangling sleeves and announced the appearance of the jester.

Forms
The cap ‘n’ bells could be in the following forms: 
“Ass's ears” and an “ass's tail”, often curling forward
“Horns”
“Cockscomb Crest”
Royal Court Jester Costume
Bi–Color Coxcomb Cap
Fool’s Cap and Masque
Other forms of fool’s cap in England  were shaped like a monk’s cowl with ass’s ears, a high–pointed cap covered with bells, or a round cap with an imposing feather.

Gallery

References

Caps
Jesters